Shigayevka (Şığay) is a rural locality (a village) in Yemashinsky Selsoviet, Belokataysky District, Bashkortostan, Russia. The population was 44 as of 2010. There are 3 streets.

Geography 
Shigayevka is located 43 km northwest of Novobelokatay (the district's administrative centre) by road. Yemashi is the nearest rural locality.

References 

Rural localities in Belokataysky District